Bawal is a big industrial town located, near Rewari city in Rewari district in Indian state of Haryana. It lies in the National Capital Region (NCR) of India. It is located on national highway NH 48 (formerly called NH 8), 11 km from Rewari, the district headquarter, 50 km from Gurugram and 91 km from New Delhi railway station. Bawal Tehsil is a part of the Rewari district. It was one of the three districts of the erstwhile Nabha State under British Raj.

Geography 
Bawal is located at coordinates .

It has an average elevation of 266 metres (872  feet).

History
Bawal was a part of the Jhajjar princely state prior to the events of the Indian Rebellion. The Nawab of Jhajjar, Abdur Rehman, participated in campaigns against the East India Company, and was captured and hung on 23 January 1858. The Company authorities gave Bawal to Hira Singh, the ruler of Nabha, who had participated in the successful suppression of the revolt. He constructed a fort made from slate and stone masonry here in 1875. Its three-sided walls and rear gateway have been maintained by the Indian government for purposes of tourism.

Demographics 
As of 2011 Indian Census, Bawal had a total population of 16,776, of which 8,828 were males and 7,948 were females.

HSIIDC Industrial Model Township Bawal 

Industrial Model Township Bawal in NCR in Haryana, is a large industrial centre has been developed by the Haryana State Industrial and Infrastructure Development Corporation (HSIIDC) in 1995.It is a state government project to establish multiple auto parts manufacturers in mid-1990's. It also synergises with other IMT of Haryana along Delhi Western Peripheral Expressway such as IMT Bahadurgarh, IMT Kundli, Sonipat and IMT Manesar. During last three years, HSIIDC has allotted 218 Industrial plots in Bawal for medium- and large-scale projects with capital investment of around US$4.18 billion (2016). Many multinational corporations including Honda, Toyota, Hitachi, Haco Group, Musashi Auto Parts India, POSCO, Kansai Nerolac, Asahi India, Atlas, YKK India Pvt. Ltd., Euothern Hema, Keihin, Caparo Maruti, Harley-Davidson and Ahresty India along with many Indian companies such as Delseal, Omax, Rico, Minda Group, Rubyco International, Tenneco Automotive India, Continental Equipment and Multicolor Steels, Caparo power plant, etc. have set up plants.

Transport 
The nearest airport is Indira Gandhi International Airport at New Delhi, about 75 km away. Bawal railway station is on the Alwar-Rewari railway line.

National Highway NH 48 (formerly called NH 8) passes through Bawal connecting it with the major cities of Delhi, Jaipur, Ahmedabad, Vadodra, Surat and Mumbai. The former NH 71 used to connect Bawal to Rewari before it was realigned and widened to a 4-lane toll road bypassing east of Rewari city.

Wildlife

HSIDC Bawal wetland 

During the winter, over 4,000 migratory birds of 50 species from Siberia, Russia, Mongolia, Alaska and other parts of the United States are found at a wetland between Toyota Gosei Minda factory and Baba Pachpir Temple in the east HSIIDC Estate in Bawal. Bird species found here are wagtails, common teal, pintail, northern shoveller, garganey, eurasian coot, redshank, common sandpiper, ruff, wood sandpiper, marsh sandpiper, stint, kentish plover, greater sand plover, little ringed plover, white-tailed lapwing, greater flamingo, common pochard, ferruginous pochard, gulls and pied avocet. The pacific golden plover, rare a rare bird species from Western Alaska, has also been spotted.

Over 200,000 migratory birds have been spotted at Masani barrage wetland, which is 15 km southeast from Bawal wetland.

See also 
 Tourism in Haryana

References 

Cities and towns in Rewari district